Simons Addai is the member of parliament for the constituency. He was elected on the ticket of the National Democratic Congress (NDC) and won a majority of 1,757 votes to become the MP. He had also represented the constituency in the 4th Republic parliament.

See also
List of Ghana Parliament constituencies

References 

Parliamentary constituencies in the Bono East Region